Delias isocharis is a butterfly in the family Pieridae. It was described by Walter Rothschild and Karl Jordan in 1907. It is endemic to New Guinea.

The wingspan is about 40–43 mm. Adults are similar to Delias ligata, but may be distinguished by having, on the underside hindwing, the white area extended from the margin along the outer edge of the red submarginal line as far as its end on the submedian.

Subspecies
D. i. isocharis (Central Highlands, Papua New Guinea)
D. i. latiapicalis Joicey & Talbot, 1922 (Weyland Mountains, Irian Jaya)

References

External links
Delias at Markku Savela's Lepidoptera and Some Other Life Forms

isocharis
Butterflies described in 1907
Endemic fauna of New Guinea